Allium tripterum is a plant species endemic to a small region near Mingora, in northwestern Pakistan. It is a perennial herb up to 60 cm tall, with a spherical bulb up to 20 mm across. Leaves are long and narrow. Umbels are lax with only about 5-15 long-pediceled flowers. Tepals are pink or white with prominent purple midveins.

References

tripterum
Onions
Flora of Pakistan
Plants described in 1975